"Don't You Know" is a song by French DJ and record producer Kungs with vocals by British singer Jamie N Commons. It was released on 24 June 2016 as a digital download by House of Barclay.

Music video
The accompanying music video for the song was released on Kungs' Vevo channel on YouTube on 24 June 2016. It was directed by Giany for La Main Productions. The actors in the music video were Kungs himself and Lola Viande.

Track listing

Charts and certifications

Weekly charts

Year-end charts

Certifications

Release history

References

2016 singles
2016 songs
Kungs songs
Songs written by Kungs